Alexander Livingstone (August 2, 1884 – October 26, 1944) was a Canadian politician and municipal councillor in Edmonton, Alberta.

Early life

Livingstone was born in Bathgate, Scotland in 1884, and emigrated to Canada in 1904.  There he established himself as a draper.  He started operating out of his home, but eventually built a four-storey department store - the Caledonian Department Stores - that was one of the foremost in Edmonton.

Political career

In May 1912, Herman McInnes and Charles Gowan resigned from the Edmonton City Council.  In the ensuing by-election, Livingstone topped a field of six candidates and was elected to fulfill Gowan's term, which lasted until the 1913 election.  Livingstone did not seek re-election at the term's conclusion.

In the 1922 election, Livingstone was one of five candidates to challenge incumbent mayor David Duggan's bid for re-election.  He finished third, behind Duggan and former and future mayor Joseph Clarke.  He did not re-enter politics thereafter.

References

City of Edmonton biography of Alexander Livingstone

1884 births
1944 deaths
Businesspeople from Edmonton
Edmonton city councillors
People from Bathgate
Scottish emigrants to Canada